Terence Wyly Monro Grier (August 12, 1936 – March 13, 2023) was a Canadian politician, lecturer and university administrator.

Education and political career 
Grier graduated from the University of Trinity College in the University of Toronto in 1958. He served as the New Democratic Party's Member of Parliament for Toronto—Lakeshore from 1972 to 1974.

Academic career 
Following his defeat in the 1974 federal election he returned to Ryerson Polytechnical Institute in Toronto where he was an instructor in the politics department. After terms as Dean of Arts and Vice-President Academic, he was appointed Ryerson's president in 1988 and oversaw the institution's transformation into a university by the end of his term in 1995.

Personal life and death 
His wife, Ruth Grier, was a politician in her own right serving on Etobicoke's city council and in the Ontario legislature as a New Democratic Party MPP and cabinet minister.

Grier died on March 13, 2023, at the age of 86.

Electoral record

References

External links
 

1936 births
2023 deaths
Members of the House of Commons of Canada from Ontario
Canadian political scientists
New Democratic Party MPs
Presidents of Toronto Metropolitan University
Trinity College (Canada) alumni
University of Toronto alumni
Upper Canada College alumni
Canadian university and college chief executives